Nancy F. Koehn (born 1959) is an author and a business historian at Harvard Business School in Boston, Massachusetts, where she is the James E. Robison Professor of Business Administration, and was a visiting scholar during 2011–2013. She is also a member of Harvard's Faculty of Arts and Sciences, in the Economics Department.

Education
 B.A., History (Phi Beta Kappa), Stanford University
 Master of Public Policy (M.P.P.), Kennedy School of Government, Harvard University
 MA, Harvard University (European History)
 PhD, Harvard University (European History)

Career
Koehn is a business historian at Harvard Faculty of Arts and Sciences and has been a business historian at Harvard Business School, since 2011 (some online sources say 1991).  She began as a Visiting Scholar (2011–2013), then was offered the James E. Robison Professor of Business Administration, which she has held since 2013. Her predecessor in that endowed Chair was James Cash Jr.

Koehn is widely quoted on radio and television, and is a regular featured contributor to WGBH, an NPR radio station in Boston, Massachusetts, near Harvard Business School.  She has been a speaker at the World Economic Forum in Davos, the Aspen Institute Ideas Festival, and the World Business Forum, and has appeared on American Experience, Good Morning America, Bloomberg Television, CNBC's Moneywheel, The NewsHour, A&E's Biography, CNN's Money Line, and many other television programs. She writes regularly for The New York Times, The Washington Post, The Huffington Post, and the Harvard Business Review Online, and is a regular commentator on BBC.   Numerous corporations consult with her for strategic guidance.

She is also a director of Fashion To Figure, a clothing retailer, and of Tempur Sealy International.

Academic appointments
 2004–2011, lecturer, History and Literature concentration, Department of Economics, Faculty of Arts and Sciences, Harvard University, Cambridge, MA
 2011–2013, visiting scholar, Harvard Business School, Allston, Massachusetts
 2013–present, James E. Robison Professor of Business Administration, Harvard Business School, Allston, Massachusetts

Author 
In Forged in Crisis, Koehn explores what qualities make for a great leader, using the examples of Ernest Shackleton, Abraham Lincoln, Dietrich Bonhoeffer, Rachel Carson, and Frederick Douglass. The book became a Wall Street Journal Bestseller in November 2017.

She has devoted significant interest to women in leadership; has written two books about Oprah Winfrey, and had a role in Harvard's offering her an honorary doctorate.

Personal life
Koehn is single and is a breast cancer survivor. She describes herself as "an avid equestrian" and, on her personal website, as a "Teacher, Rider, Poet, Pilgrim". She often references her love of horses, of riding horses, and her care of three horses.

Works
Books:
 , spotlights five masters of crisis: polar explorer Ernest Shackleton; President Abraham Lincoln; abolitionist Frederick Douglass; Nazi-resisting clergyman Dietrich Bonhoeffer; and environmental crusader Rachel Carson.
 Oprah (Brand) Renew (2011)
 Oprah: Leading with Heart (2011)
 Ernest Shackleton: Exploring Leadership, (2012)
 The Story of American Business: From the Pages of the New York Times (2009, Harvard Business Press, 
 Brand New: How Entrepreneurs Earned Consumers' Trust from Wedgwood to Dell (2001)
 The Power of Commerce: Economy and Governance in the First British Empire (1994)

Contributing Author:
 Creative Capitalism:  A Conversation with Bill Gates, Warren Buffett and other Economic Leaders (2008)
 Remember Who You Are: Life Stories That Inspire the Heart and Mind (2004)
 Beauty and Business (2000)
 The Intellectual Venture Capitalist: John H. McArthur and the Work of the Harvard Business School, 1980–1995 (1999)
 Creating Modern Capitalism: How Entrepreneurs, Companies, and Countries Triumphed in Three Industrial Revolutions (1997)
 Management Past and Present: A Casebook on American Business History (1995)

Journal articles:
 Koehn, Nancy F. "Great Men, Great Pay? Why CEO Compensation Is Sky High." Opinions. Washington Post (June 12, 2014). View Details
 Koehn, Nancy F. "Calling All Leaders: Feed and Water Yourself." Huffington Post, The Blog (March 25, 2014).

Harvard Business School Case Studies:

Nancy Koehn has written and supervised Harvard Business School business cases, including
 Starbucks Coffee Company
 Bono and U2
 Celeste Walker
 Dell Computer
 Ernest Shackleton
 Estée Lauder
 Henry Heinz
 Marshall Field
 Milton Hershey
 Oprah Winfrey
 Stonyfield Yogurt
 Whole Foods
 Wedgwood

See also
 Harvard Business School
 Business history
 Economic history

References

External sources
 Nancy Koehn's faculty profile, Harvard Business School
 Nancy F. Koehn's personal website
 Nancy Koehn's Twitter account – @nancykoehn
 Harvard Business School Working Knowledge (case studies; HBS pioneered the case study method in business education
 The James and Anne Robinson Foundation, Armonk, NY
 Forged in Crisis book website

21st-century American historians
Date of birth missing (living people)
Economic historians
American female equestrians
Living people
Harvard Business School faculty
Harvard Kennedy School alumni
Writers from Boston
Stanford University alumni
American women historians
American women in business
1959 births
Historians from Massachusetts
21st-century American women writers